Dukinfield Central Railway Station served the town of Dukinfield from 1864 until 1959. 
It was situated on Wharf Street, near Station Street and adjacent to the Peak Forest Canal - the line from the station went over the canal on a cast-iron bridge, which is still there (2014). It is believed the bridge was cast locally and was the first cast-iron railway bridge ever built.  The station platform extended out over the bridge. The station was built on a series of stone arches, one of which served as a subway between the two platforms and is still in existence today (2014), but is now used as a tyre storage area.  There are still signs of the platforms.

References
Tameside Council Chronology of Dukinfield
1940s OS map of the area

Disused railway stations in Tameside
Former Great Central Railway stations
Railway stations in Great Britain opened in 1864
Railway stations in Great Britain closed in 1959
Dukinfield